Walapa Tangjitsusorn (born 14 June 1953) is a Thai sprinter. She competed in the women's 100 metres at the 1984 Summer Olympics.

References

External links
 

1953 births
Living people
Athletes (track and field) at the 1984 Summer Olympics
Walapa Tangjitsusorn
Walapa Tangjitsusorn
Place of birth missing (living people)
Asian Games medalists in athletics (track and field)
Walapa Tangjitsusorn
Athletes (track and field) at the 1982 Asian Games
Athletes (track and field) at the 1986 Asian Games
Medalists at the 1982 Asian Games
Medalists at the 1986 Asian Games
Southeast Asian Games medalists in athletics
Walapa Tangjitsusorn
Competitors at the 1977 Southeast Asian Games
Olympic female sprinters
Walapa Tangjitsusorn
Walapa Tangjitsusorn